Badminton Football Club is a former Chilean football club based in the city of Santiago, until 1969, when they moved to Curicó.
The club was founded 12 July 1912 and it was one of the eight teams that founded the first division professional of the Chilean football league, in 1933.

Since 1950, the club adopted the name of Ferrobadminton, when it merged with another Santiago team, Ferroviarios, until 1969, when both teams took separate paths again.

In 1969 they moved to Curicó, and since then, they were known as Badminton de Curicó, until 1973 when the club folded.

Honors
 Segunda Division: 1965

References
 

Defunct football clubs in Chile
Football clubs in Chile
Association football clubs established in 1912
Association football clubs disestablished in 1973
Sport in Santiago
Sport in Maule Region
1912 establishments in Chile
1973 disestablishments in Chile